René Metge (born 23 October 1941 in Montrouge, France) is a professional rally driver from France. He won the Dakar Rally three times (in 1981, 1984 and 1986).

Career 
Metge began his career in international motor racing in 1973, starting in the Formula Renault 2.0 West European Cup. He scored 28 points in the general classification there with 28 points. In later years, Metge also appeared in the French Supertouring Championship, FIA World Endurance Championship, World Sportscar Championship, World Touring Car Championship, Porsche 944 Turbo Cup France, 24 Hours of Le Mans and European Touring Car Championship.

Metge also competed in Dakar Rally, where he won three times: in 1981, 1984 and 1986.

Bibliography 
 René Metge

References 

Dakar Rally drivers
Dakar Rally winning drivers
French rally drivers
Off-road racing drivers
1941 births
Living people
24 Hours of Spa drivers
24 Hours of Le Mans drivers
French racing drivers
Rally raid truck drivers

Porsche Motorsports drivers